Master Celebrations is the "best of" compilation album from No Fun at All, released on 11 November 2002.

Track listing
 "Master Celebrator"
 "Suicide Machine"
 "Strong and Smart"
 "Out of Bounds"
 "I Won't Believe in You"
 "Wow and I Say Wow"
 "Celestial Q&A"
 "In a Rhyme"
 "Stranded"
 "Beachparty"
 "Should Have Known"
 "Lose Another Friend"
 "Where's the Truth?"
 "Believers"
 "My Extraordinary Mind"
 "Beat 'Em Down"
 "Vision"
 "Talking to Remind Me"
 "Catch Me Running Round"
 "Growing Old, Growing Cold"
 "Second Best"
 "Aftermath"
 "Lovely Ordeal"
 "Alcohol"

2002 compilation albums
No Fun at All albums